Ilga or ILGA may refer to:
 Ilga (river), a river in Russia, tributary of the Lena
 International Lesbian, Gay, Bisexual, Trans and Intersex Association, or ILGA
 Illinois General Assembly, in the United States
 Ilga, a Latvian feminine given name; people with this name include:
 Ilga Bērtulsone, Latvian athlete
 Ilga Kļaviņa, Latvian chess player
 Ilga Šuplinska, Latvian politician
 Ilga Winicov, American biologist
 Ilga Manor, in Latvia

See also 
 IIGA